Melissa Claire Egan is an American actress, best known for her roles as Annie Lavery on All My Children and Chelsea Lawson on The Young and the Restless.

Early years
Egan was born to Mary and Dennis Egan, and is the middle child. She has two brothers, Ryan and Scott. She was raised Roman Catholic. Egan graduated from the University of North Carolina at Chapel Hill with a B.A. in Dramatic Art.

Career

Egan has guest starred on such television series as Dawson's Creek and One Tree Hill. Her debut film role was as Ali Court in the 2005 movie, Wrestling. On July 10, 2006, she debuted on the daytime soap opera All My Children as runaway mother Annie Novak Chandler. Coincidentally, one of Egan's first acting appearances was on All My Children at age 12, playing an extra.

Egan guest starred as an exotic dancer on the season 6, episode 7 of CBS  drama Criminal Minds.

On January 20, 2011, a statement was released on Egan's Facebook page that she had decided to leave All My Children: "After 4 and a half incredible years as a member of the All My Children cast, I have made the extremely difficult decision to leave the Pine Valley family that I have come to love and respect so much."

Egan returned to All My Children for a three-episode arc to wrap up Annie's storyline with Ryan Lavery and Emma Lavery which culminated on August 5, 2011.

On October 3, 2011, it was announced that Egan had joined The Young and the Restless as a mystery woman, Chelsea Lawson, involved in Billy Abbott's arrest in Myanmar. Her first airdate was November 11, 2011. On January 31, 2018, Egan confirmed  earlier reports that she had decided to leave the soap, saying it was a "goodbye for now" on her social media. It was further reported that the door would be left open for the actress to return. In April 2019, it was announced that Egan was reprising her role on the show.

On June 7, 2012, Egan played the role of Milo's date Jessica on TBS sitcom Men at Work.

Egan has served as a celebrity spokesperson for Proactiv Solution with former AMC co-star Chrishell Stause.

Personal life 
In February 2013, she became engaged to Matt Katrosar. The couple were wed on July 26, 2014, in an interfaith service in Santa Barbara, California as Egan is Catholic and Katrosar is Jewish. In August 2021, Egan gave birth to the couple's first child, a son, after experiencing two miscarriages. In early 2023, it was revealed that Egan was pregnant with the couple's second child.

Filmography

Awards and nominations

References

External links
 
 Melissa Claire Egan Official Website
 Melissa Claire Egan's biography at ABCMeduanet.com
 Melissa Claire Egan Interview
 wrestling, Melissa's film debut

American film actresses
Actresses from New York (state)
American television actresses
American soap opera actresses
University of North Carolina at Chapel Hill alumni
Living people
People from Pound Ridge, New York
20th-century American actresses
21st-century American actresses
Year of birth missing (living people)